Epischnia illotella is a species of snout moth in the genus Epischnia. It was described by Philipp Christoph Zeller in 1839 and is known from Italy, Spain, Portugal, France, Germany, Croatia, Albania, North Macedonia, Greece, Romania, Ukraine, Russia and North Africa.

References

Moths described in 1839
Phycitini
Moths of Europe